In computer science, a mergeable heap (also called a meldable heap) is an abstract data type, which is a heap supporting a merge operation.

Definition 

A mergeable heap supports the usual heap operations:
 Make-Heap(), create an empty heap.
 Insert(H,x), insert an element x into the heap H.
 Min(H), return the minimum element, or Nil if no such element exists.
 Extract-Min(H), extract and return the minimum element, or Nil if no such element exists.

And one more that distinguishes it:
 Merge(H1,H2), combine the elements of H1 and H2 into a single heap.

Trivial implementation 

It is straightforward to implement a mergeable heap given a simple heap:

Merge(H1,H2):
 x ← Extract-Min(H2)
 while x ≠ Nil
 Insert(H1, x)
 x ← Extract-Min(H2)

This can however be wasteful as each Extract-Min(H) and Insert(H,x) typically have to maintain the heap property.

More efficient implementations 

Examples of mergeable heap data structures include:

 Binomial heap
 Fibonacci heap
 Leftist tree
 Pairing heap
 Skew heap

In most mergeable heap structures, merging is the fundamental operation on which others are based.  Insertion is implemented by merging a new single-element heap  with the existing heap.  Deletion is implemented by merging the children of the deleted node.

See also
 Addressable heap

References 

Heaps (data structures)